David Jameson (born November 1, 1984 in North Vancouver, British Columbia) is a field hockey player from Canada, who was first selected to the Men's National Team for the 2002 Belgium Tour. He is the brother of Canada women's national field hockey team player Stephanie Jameson.

International senior competitions
 2003 – Pan American Games, Santo Domingo (2nd)
 2004 – Olympic Qualifier, Madrid (11th)
 2004 – Pan Am Cup, London (2nd)
 2006 – Commonwealth Games, Melbourne (9th)
 2014 – Commonwealth Games, Glasgow (6th)

External links
David Jameson at Field Hockey Canada
David Jameson at the 2015 Pan American Games

1984 births
Living people
Field hockey people from British Columbia
Canadian male field hockey players
Canadian people of British descent
Sportspeople from North Vancouver
Field hockey players at the 2006 Commonwealth Games
Field hockey players at the 2011 Pan American Games
Field hockey players at the 2014 Commonwealth Games
Field hockey players at the 2015 Pan American Games
Pan American Games gold medalists for Canada
Pan American Games silver medalists for Canada
Pan American Games medalists in field hockey
Hampstead & Westminster Hockey Club players
Medalists at the 2011 Pan American Games
Medalists at the 2015 Pan American Games
Commonwealth Games competitors for Canada
2010 Men's Hockey World Cup players